The Economy of Arizona had a total gross state product of $373 billion in 2020. The composition of the state's economy is moderately diverse; although health care, transportation and the government remain the largest sectors.

The state's per capita income is $40,828, ranking 39th in the U.S. The state had a median household income of $50,448, making it 22nd in the country and just below the U.S. national mean. Early in its history, Arizona's economy relied on the "five C's": copper (see Copper mining in Arizona), cotton, cattle, citrus, and climate (tourism). Copper is still extensively mined from many expansive open-pit and underground mines, accounting for two-thirds of the nation's output.

Employment

Total employment 2016
2,379,409
Total employer establishments 2016
139,134

The state government is Arizona's largest employer, while Banner Health is the state's largest private employer, with over 39,000 employees (2016). , the state's unemployment rate was 5.4%.

The top employment sectors in Arizona are (August 2014, excludes agriculture):

Largest employers
According to The Arizona Republic, the largest private employers in the state  were:

Taxation
Arizona collects personal income taxes in five brackets: 2.59%, 2.88%, 3.36%, 4.24% and 4.54%. The state transaction privilege tax is 5.6%; however, county and municipal sales taxes generally add an additional 2%.

The state rate on transient lodging (hotel/motel) is 7.27%. The state of Arizona does not levy a state tax on food for home consumption or on drugs prescribed by a licensed physician or dentist. However, some cities in Arizona do levy a tax on food for home consumption.

All fifteen Arizona counties levy a tax. Incorporated municipalities also levy transaction privilege taxes which, with the exception of their hotel/motel tax, are generally in the range of 1-to-3%. These added assessments could push the combined sales tax rate to as high as 10.7%.

See also
 List of power stations in Arizona

References